Wang Kuang-Shih (born 2 August 1967) is a Taiwanese baseball player who competed in the 1992 Summer Olympics.

He was part of the Chinese Taipei baseball team which won the silver medal. He played as infielder.

External links

1967 births
Living people
Baseball players at the 1992 Summer Olympics
Olympic baseball players of Taiwan
Taiwanese baseball players
Olympic silver medalists for Taiwan
Olympic medalists in baseball
Baseball players at the 1990 Asian Games
Medalists at the 1992 Summer Olympics
Asian Games competitors for Chinese Taipei
People from Hualien County